MES Keveeyam College, Valanchery, is a general degree college located in Valanchery, Malappuram district, Kerala. It was established in the year 1981. The college is affiliated with Calicut University. This college offers different courses in arts, commerce and science.

The secretary and correspondent of the college is Prof K P Hassan

Departments

Science
Physics
Chemistry
Mathematics
Computer Application
Psychology
Botany
Zoology

Arts and Commerce
Malayalam
English
Arabic
Physical Education
Commerce

Accreditation
The college is  recognized by the University Grants Commission (UGC).

Notable alumni

 V. P. Sanu, Politician

See also

References

External links
http://www.meskvmcollege.org
University of Calicut
University Grants Commission
National Assessment and Accreditation Council

Universities and colleges in Malappuram district
Educational institutions established in 1981
1981 establishments in Kerala
Arts and Science colleges in Kerala
Colleges affiliated with the University of Calicut